Nurullah Kaya (born 20 July 1986) is a Turkish footballer who plays for TFF Third League club Yeni Mersin İdmanyurdu. He made his Süper Lig debut on 11 December 2011.

External links
 

1986 births
Sportspeople from Batman, Turkey
Living people
Turkish footballers
Association football midfielders
Mersin İdman Yurdu footballers
Adana Demirspor footballers
Tarsus Idman Yurdu footballers
Süper Lig players
TFF First League players
TFF Second League players
TFF Third League players